Canalispira kerni is a species of very small sea snail, a marine gastropod mollusk or micromollusk in the family Cystiscidae.

Description
Canalispira kerni has a strong, smooth, ivory-colored shell. The shell's surface has yellowish flammules on it. Its protoconch is dome shaped and white.

Distribution

References

Cystiscidae
Gastropods described in 2007